The 2022 Newham London Borough Council election took place on 5 May 2022. All 66 members of Newham London Borough Council were elected. The election took place alongside local elections in the other London boroughs and elections to local authorities across the United Kingdom.

In the previous election in 2018, the Labour Party maintained its control of the council, winning all 60 seats. The 2022 election took place under new election boundaries, which will increase the number of councillors to 66. The election coincided with an election for the mayor of Newham after a governance referendum resulted in the borough keeping a directly elected mayor.

Background
A total of 253 candidates stood in the election for the 66 seats being contested across 24 wards. Candidates included a full slate from the Labour Party (as had been the case at every election since the borough council had been formed in 1964), and a full slate from the Green Party for the first time. The Conservative Party stood 65 candidates (not a full slate of 66, due to a delayed Election Officer's ruling of an over-subscribed nomination), making it the first time since 2010 they have not stood a full slate. Other candidates who ran were 26 Christian Peoples Alliance, 17 Liberal Democrats, 4 TUSC, 3 Reform UK, and 6 Independents.

History

The thirty-two London boroughs were established in 1965 by the London Government Act 1963. They are the principal authorities in Greater London and have responsibilities including education, housing, planning, highways, social services, libraries, recreation, waste, environmental health and revenue collection. Some of the powers are shared with the Greater London Authority, which also manages passenger transport, police and fire.

Newham has been under Labour control since its creation, besides a period of no overall control from 1968–1971. In the most recent election in 2018, Labour won all sixty seats with 67.2% of the vote across the borough. The Conservative Party received 15.2% of the vote, the Liberal Democrats received 5.9% of the vote and the Green Party of England and Wales received 5.2% of the vote but none of these won any seats. The Labour candidate Rokhsana Fiaz became mayor of Newham in the concurrent mayoral election, succeeding Robin Wales with 73.4% of the vote in the first round.

Council term
In September 2018, Veronica Oakeshott, a Labour candidate for Boleyn ward, resigned because she was moving to Oxfordshire. The by-election in November 2018 was won by Moniba Khan, the Labour candidate. In August 2020, Julianne Marriot, a Labour councillor for East Ham Central, resigned for work reasons. Due to the COVID-19 pandemic, a by-election to fill her seat could not be held until 6 May 2021 alongside the 2021 London mayoral election and London Assembly election. The Labour candidate Farah Nazeer was elected, with the Conservative candidate coming in second place.

In July 2020, eighteen councillors submitted a complaint to the Labour Party about the mayor Rokhsana Fiaz, claiming she treated people unfairly, humiliated them and "picked on colleagues". Two councillors also complained that she hadn't dealt with antisemitism in the local party. After she was re-selected as the Labour mayoral candidate, with the party having responded to neither complaint, Pat Murphy and Quintin Peppiatt resigned from the Labour group.

As with most London boroughs, Newham elected its councillors under new boundaries decided by the Local Government Boundary Commission for England, which it produced after a period of consultation. The number of councillors increased from 60 to 66, under new boundaries with eighteen three-councillor wards and six two-councillor wards.

Mayoral referendum
A referendum was held on 6 May 2021 on whether to retain the mayoral system, where voters elect a mayor every four years, who appoints their own cabinet, or to change to the committee system, where councillors select members of committees and a council leader. The result was to retain the mayoral system, with 56% of voters supporting the status quo.

Campaign

Electoral process
Newham, like other London borough councils, elects all of its councillors at once every four years. The previous election took place in 2018. The election will take place by multi-member first-past-the-post voting, with each ward being represented by two or three councillors. Electors will have as many votes as there are councillors to be elected in their ward, with the top two or three being elected.

All registered electors (British, Irish, Commonwealth and European Union citizens) living in London aged 18 or over will be entitled to vote in the election. People who live at two addresses in different councils, such as university students with different term-time and holiday addresses, are entitled to be registered for and vote in elections in both local authorities. Voting in-person at polling stations took place from 7:00 to 22:00 on election day, and voters were able to apply for postal votes or proxy votes in advance of the election.

Previous council composition

Results summary

Ward Results

Beckton

Boleyn

Canning Town North

Canning Town South

Custom House

East Ham

East Ham South

Forest Gate North

Forest Gate South

Green Street East

Green Street West

Little Ilford

Manor Park

Maryland

Plaistow North

Plaistow South

Plaistow West & Canning Town East

Plashet

Royal Albert

Royal Victoria

Stratford

Stratford Olympic Park

Wall End

West Ham

By-elections between 2022 and 2026
None as at 1st March 2023.

Council term 2022-2026
Prior to the 2022 election, but after nominations were submitted, Labour candidate for Canning Town South Belgica Guaña was suspended from the Labour Party, pending an investigation. Due to the timing, Guaña appeared on the ballot paper as a Labour candidate and was subsequently elected. Despite press reports to the contrary, Cllr Guaña was admitted into the Labour Group on the council at the first Annual Council Meeting on the term. However, by December 2022, Cllr Guaña was listed as an Independent councillor, having been removed from the Labour Group.

References

Council elections in the London Borough of Newham
Newham